Ampittia dioscorides, the common bush hopper or simply bush hopper, is a species of butterfly found in India, China, Indochina, Cambodia and on to Borneo, Sumatra and Java belonging to the family Hesperiidae.

Description

Subspecies
A. d. dioscorides Ceylon, Peninsular India, Calcutta, Sikkim to Assam, Burma
A. d. etura (Mabille, 1891) Vietnam, Hainan, South Yunnan, Taiwan
A. d. camertes (Hewitson, 1868) Burma, Thailand, Laos, Yunnan, Malaysia, Singapore, Borneo, Sumatra, Nias, Java, Bali

References

External links

Images representing Ampittia discorides at Consortium for the Barcode of Life

dioscorides
Butterflies of Asia
Butterflies of Singapore